Atanas Gradoborliyata (1860 - 24 May 1903) was a Bulgarian revolutionary, a worker of the Internal Macedonian-Adrianople Revolutionary Organization (IMARO).

Atanas Gradoborliyata was born in the Bulgarian majority village of Gradobor (now Pentalofos, Kallithea municipality, Thessaloniki regional unit), in the Salonika Vilayet of the Ottoman Empire. Together with Ivancho Karasuliyata, Iliya Karchovaliyata, Apostol Petkov and others, he was among the old workers of the revolutionary organization on which Gotse Delchev relied in the first years of IMARO's consolidation. As a leader of a revolutionary band, Atanas Gradoborliyata and all his freedom fighters died in 1903 near the village of Gradobor, poisoned by (sic) Grecomans.

References

1860 births
1903 deaths
People from Thessaloniki (regional unit)
Members of the Internal Macedonian Revolutionary Organization
Bulgarians from Aegean Macedonia
19th-century Bulgarian people
Bulgarian revolutionaries
Macedonian Bulgarians